Fabergé may refer to:

Companies
House of Fabergé, a Russian jewellery firm founded in 1842 by Gustav Fabergé
Fabergé & Cie, a Parisian jewellery firm founded in 1924 by two sons of Peter Carl Fabergé
Fabergé Inc., an American personal care products company that acquired rights to use the Fabergé name

Other
Fabergé (cosmetics), a brand name used by Fabergé Inc.
Fabergé eggs, jewelled eggs created by the House of Fabergé
Fabergé workmaster, a craftsman who produced objects for the House of Fabergé

People
Gustav Fabergé (1814–1893), a jeweller who founded the House of Fabergé
Peter Carl Fabergé (1846–1920), elder son of Gustav
Agathon Fabergé (1862–1895), younger son of Gustav
Agathon Carl Theodor Fabergé (1876–1951), second son of Peter Carl
Alexander Julius Fabergé (1877–1952), third son of Peter Carl
Theo Fabergé (1922–2007), grandson of Peter Carl
Tatiana Fabergé (1930–2020), granddaughter of Peter Carl
Sarah Fabergé (born 1958), daughter of Theo